The Church of San Andrés (Spanish: Iglesia Parroquial de San Andrés) is a church located in Presencio, Spain. It was declared Bien de Interés Cultural in 1983.

References 

Bien de Interés Cultural landmarks in the Province of Burgos
Churches in Castile and León